The Indianapolis mayoral election of 1951 took place on November 6, 1951 and saw the election of Republican municipal court judge Alex M. Clark as mayor, defeating Democratic incumbent Philip L. Bayt. Clark became one of the youngest mayors in Indianapolis' history.

Results
Subsequent to losing the election, Bayt resigned as mayor one month before his term expired in order to accept an appointment as judge of Municipal Court 3.

References

1951
1951 United States mayoral elections
1951 Indiana elections